Arkana may refer to:
 Arkana, Louisiana, a community in the United States
 Arkana, Baxter County, Arkansas, a community in the United States
 Arkana Publishing, a publishing imprint of Penguin Group of mainly esoteric books
 Keny Arkana, a French rap artist
 Arkana, a character in the French animated TV series Spartakus and the Sun Beneath the Sea
 Arkana, a character from the anime Yu-Gi-Oh!
 Arkana, a furniture manufacturer of the Eames era
Arkayna, a main character from the new Nickelodeon show Mysticons. She is a princess, and leader of the Mysticons, where she is called Dragon Mage.
Arkana, an online literary magazine published by the Arkansas Writers MFA Program at the University of Central Arkansas
Renault Arkana, a sport utility vehicle model

See also
 Arcana (disambiguation)
 Arkarna, an electronic music group
 Ark (disambiguation)
 Arkona (disambiguation)